Laila Schou Nilsen (18 March 1919 – 30 July 1998) was one of the foremost Norwegian sportspeople of the 20th century, best known as a speed skater, alpine skier, and tennis player. Across her sporting career – which also included handball, ski jumping, cross-country skiing, and motorsport – Nilsen won 101 Norwegian Championship titles, of which 86 were in tennis.

Speed skating
At the 1937 edition of the World Allround Speed Skating Championships for Women at the Eisstadion Davos in Davos, Switzerland, she set records in all four distances (500 m, 1,000 m, 3,000 m, and 5,000 m). She also won the 1938 World Championships in Oslo. Her 500 m record of 46.6 seconds held until 1955, when Tamara Rylova of the Soviet Union beat it at the Medeo track in Alma Ata. Her record for the 1,500 m was not bested until 1950.

Nilsen was the Norwegian Allround Champion in speed skating in 1935, 1937, 1939, and 1940.

Medals
An overview of speed skating medals won by Laila Schou Nilsen at elite championships, listed with the years won.

*The World Allround Championships were unofficial from 1933 to 1935.

Personal records
To put these personal records in perspective, the WR column lists the official world records on the dates that Laila Schou Nilsen skated her personal records.

Alpine skiing 
As speed skating for women was not included in the Olympic program for the 1936 Winter Olympics, 16 year old Nilsen sought out other sports in which she could compete at the Olympics. She settled on alpine skiing, a sport in which she'd earned good results at the national level but not internationally. After just a month of intensive training in the lead-up to the Olympics, she won the downhill race and claimed Olympic bronze in the alpine combined. No medals were awarded in sub-disciplines at the 1936 Olympic Games, so her gold medal-worthy downhill finish did not result in the honour it would have had it come at a later Olympics.

After the World War II, Nilsen competed in alpine skiing at the 1948 Winter Olympics in St. Moritz, where she finished 7th in downhill and 14th in slalom.

Other
Nilsen was awarded the Egebergs Ærespris in 1936 for "outstanding achievements in alpine skiing and speed skating and excellent achievements in tennis."

Nilsen was also a member of the Norwegian women's national handball team and participated in the Monte Carlo Rally in 1963.

References

Citations

Bibliography

 Eng, Trond. All Time International Championships, Complete Results: 1889 – 2002. Askim, Norway: WSSSA-Skøytenytt, 2002.
 Eng, Trond; Gjerde, Arild and Teigen, Magne. Norsk Skøytestatistikk Gjennom Tidene, Menn/Kvinner, 1999 (6. utgave). Askim/Skedsmokorset/Veggli, Norway: WSSSA-Skøytenytt, 1999.
 Eng, Trond; Gjerde, Arild; Teigen, Magne and Teigen, Thorleiv. Norsk Skøytestatistikk Gjennom Tidene, Menn/Kvinner, 2004 (7. utgave). Askim/Skedsmokorset/Veggli/Hokksund, Norway: WSSSA-Skøytenytt, 2004.
 Eng, Trond and Teigen, Magne. Komplette Resultater fra offisielle Norske Mesterskap på skøyter, 1894 – 2005. Askim/Veggli, Norway: WSSSA-Skøytenytt, 2005.
 Teigen, Magne. Komplette Resultater Norske Mesterskap På Skøyter, 1887 – 1989: Menn/Kvinner, Senior/Junior. Veggli, Norway: WSSSA-Skøytenytt, 1989.
 Teigen, Magne. Komplette Resultater Internasjonale Mesterskap 1889 – 1989: Menn/Kvinner, Senior/Junior, allround/sprint. Veggli, Norway: WSSSA-Skøytenytt, 1989.

External links 
 
 Laila Schou Nilsen at SkateResults.com
 Historical World Records. International Skating Union.
 National Championships results. Norges Skøyteforbund (Norwegian Skating Association).

1919 births
1998 deaths
Norwegian female speed skaters
Norwegian female alpine skiers
World record setters in speed skating
Olympic alpine skiers of Norway
Norwegian female tennis players
Norwegian female handball players
Alpine skiers at the 1936 Winter Olympics
Alpine skiers at the 1948 Winter Olympics
Olympic bronze medalists for Norway
Olympic medalists in alpine skiing
Medalists at the 1936 Winter Olympics
World Allround Speed Skating Championships medalists
Sportspeople from Oslo